Maury County is a county located in the U.S. state of Tennessee, in the Middle Tennessee region. As of the 2020 census, the population was 100,974. Its county seat is Columbia. Maury County is part of the Nashville-Davidson–Murfreesboro–Franklin, TN Metropolitan Statistical Area.

History
The county was formed in 1807 from Williamson County and Indian lands. Maury County was named in honor of Abram Maury, Sr. (1766-1825), a member of the Tennessee state senate from Williamson County (who was the father of Major Abram Poindexter Maury of Williamson County, later a Congressman; and an uncle of Commodore Matthew Fontaine Maury).

The rich soil of Maury County led to a thriving agricultural sector, starting in the 19th century. The county was part of a 41-county region that became known and legally defined as Middle Tennessee. In the antebellum era, planters in Maury County relied on the labor of enslaved African Americans to raise and process cotton, tobacco, and livestock (especially dairy cattle). Racial violence was less than in some areas, but the county had five documented lynchings in the period from 1877 to 1950, of which three took place in the early 20th century.

With the mechanization of agriculture, particularly from the 1930s, the need for farm labor in the county was reduced. Also, many African Americans moved to northern and midwestern industrial cities in the 20th century to escape Jim Crow conditions and for employment opportunities, particularly during the Great Migration. This movement out of the county continued after World War II. Other changes have led to increased population since the late 20th century, and the county has led the state in beef cattle production.

Columbia Race Riot of 1946
On the night of February 26–27, 1946, a disturbance known as the "Columbia Race Riot" took place in Columbia, the county seat. The national press called it the first "major racial confrontation" after the Second World War. It marked a new spirit of resistance by African-American veterans and others following their participation in World War II, which they believed had earned them their full rights as citizens, despite Jim Crow laws.

James Stephenson, an African-American Navy veteran, was with his mother at a store, where she learned that a radio she had left for repair had been sold. When she complained, the white repair apprentice, Billy Fleming, struck her. Stephenson had been a welterweight on the Navy boxing team and retaliated by hitting Fleming, who broke a window. Both Stephenson and his mother were arrested, and Fleming's father convinced the sheriff to charge them with attempted murder. When whites learned that Fleming had gone to a hospital for treatment, a mob gathered. There was risk that the Stephensons would be lynched.

Julius Blair, a 76-year-old black store owner, arranged to have the Stephensons released to his custody. He drove them out of town for their protection. When the mob did not disperse, about one hundred African-American men began to patrol their neighborhood, located south of the courthouse square, determined to resist. Four police officers were shot and wounded when they entered "Mink Slide", the name given to the African-American business district, also known as "The Bottom". Following the attack on the police, the city government requested state troopers, who were sent and soon outnumbered the black patrollers. The state troopers began ransacking black businesses and rounding up African Americans. They cut phone service to Mink Slide, but the owner of a funeral home managed to call Nashville and ask for help from the NAACP. The county jail was soon overcrowded with black "suspects." Police questioned them for days without counsel. Two black men were killed and one wounded, allegedly while "trying to escape" during a transfer. About 25 black men were eventually charged with rioting and attempted murder.

The NAACP sent Thurgood Marshall as the lead attorney to defend Stephenson and the other defendants. He gained a change of venue, but only to another small town, where trials took place throughout the summer of 1946. Marshall was assisted by two local attorneys, Zephaniah Alexander Looby, originally from the British West Indies, and Maurice Weaver, a white activist from Nashville. Marshall was also preparing litigation for education and voting rights cases.

Marshall gained acquittals for 23 of the black defendants, even with an all-white jury. At the last murder trials in November 1946, Marshall won also acquittal for Rooster Bill Pillow, and a reduction in the sentence of Papa Kennedy, allowing him to go free on bail.

Geography

Adjacent counties
Williamson County (north)
Marshall County (east)
Giles County (south)
Lawrence County (southwest)
Lewis County (west)
Hickman County (northwest)

National protected area
Natchez Trace Parkway (part)

State protected areas
Duck River Complex State Natural Area
James K. Polk Home (state historic site)
Stillhouse Hollow Falls State Natural Area
Williamsport Wildlife Management Area
Yanahli Wildlife Management Area

Demographics

2020 census

As of the 2020 United States census, there were 100,974 people, 37,104 households, and 25,951 families residing in the county.

2010 census
As of the census of 2010, there were 80,932 people and 33,332 households residing in the county. The population density was 132 people per square mile (51/km2). There were 37,470 housing units at an average density of 61 per square mile (24/km2). The racial makeup of the county was 84.4% White, 11.9% Black or African American, 0.5% Native American, 1.0% Asian, 0.1% Pacific Islander, 1.44% from other races, and 2.1% from two or more races. 5.8% of the population were Hispanic or Latino of any race.

There were 26,444 households, out of which 34.80% had children under the age of 18 living with them, 55.90% were married couples living together, 12.90% had a female householder with no husband present, and 27.10% were non-families. 23.20% of all households were made up of individuals, and 8.80% had someone living alone who was 65 years of age or older. The average household size was 2.58 and the average family size was 3.03.

In the county, the population was spread out, with 26.20% under the age of 18, 8.70% from 18 to 24, 29.80% from 25 to 44, 23.20% from 45 to 64, and 12.00% who were 65 years of age or older. The median age was 36 years. For every 100 females, there were 94.60 males. For every 100 females age 18 and over, there were 90.30 males.

The median income for a household in the county was $41,591, and the median income for a family was $48,010. Males had a median income of $37,675 versus $23,334 for females. The per capita income for the county was $19,365. About 8.30% of families and 10.90% of the population were below the poverty line, including 14.50% of those under age 18 and 12.10% of those age 65 or over.

There were declines in population and declines in population growth from 1900 to 1930, and from 1940 to 1970. These periods related to the migration of people from rural to urban areas for work, especially as mechanization reduced the need for agricultural laborers. In addition, these time periods related to the Great Migration of African Americans out of the Jim Crow South to northern and midwestern industrial cities for more opportunities. The African-American population became highly urbanized. Expansion of the railroads, auto and steel industries provided new work opportunities in the early 20th century.

Transportation
State Route 396 is a short controlled-access highway that connects I-65 to Spring Hill. U.S. Route 31, which parallels I-65 its entire length through Tennessee, runs through Columbia and Spring Hill, and U.S. Route 431 runs for a short distance in the northeastern corner of the county. The northern terminus of U.S. Route 43 and the eastern terminus of U.S. Route 412 are both located in Columbia. Other major state routes include 6, 7, 20, 50, and 99. Secondary state routes include 166, 243, 245, 246, 247, and 373.

Education
Maury County Public Schools operates public schools in the entirety of the county.

Communities

Cities
Columbia (county seat)
Mount Pleasant
Spring Hill (partly in Williamson County)

Census-designated place
Summertown (mostly in Lawrence County and a small portion in Lewis County)

Unincorporated communities

 Ashwood
 Bigbyville
 Campbells Station
Culleoka
Fly
Fountain Heights
Hampshire
Hopewell
 Pleasant Grove
Santa Fe
Sawdust
 Scotts Mill
 Screamer
 Silver Creek
Williamsport

Notable people
 Cordie Cheek (1916–1933) – 19-year-old black youth lynched in 1933 by a mob including county officials, after being falsely accused of rape
 James P. Eagle (1837–1904) – 16th Governor of Arkansas
 Rufus Estes (1857–1939), former slave, luxury railway car chef
 George Rufus Kenamore (1846–1928), Missouri merchant, government official, and politician
 James K. Polk (1795–1849), 11th President of the United States
 VanLeer Polk (1856–1907), Tennessee State Senator and diplomat
 Samuel R. Watkins (1839–1901) – author of Co. Aytch (1882)

Politics

See also
National Register of Historic Places listings in Maury County, Tennessee

References

External links

Official site
Maury County, TNGenWeb - free genealogy resources for the county

Columbia Daily Herald

 
1807 establishments in Tennessee
Populated places established in 1807
Nashville metropolitan area
Middle Tennessee